Lily Lake is a lake in Blue Earth County, Minnesota, in the United States.

Lily Lake was named for the water lilies in the lake.

See also
List of lakes in Minnesota

References

Lakes of Minnesota
Lakes of Blue Earth County, Minnesota